The Bustamante Code (Spanish: Código de Derecho Internacional Privado) is a treaty intended to establish common rules for private international law in the Americas. The common ideas of the treaty were developed by Antonio Sánchez de Bustamante y Sirven and solidified during the Sixth Pan-American Conference, held in Cuba in 1928, with the Treaty of Havana being attached as an annex to the Bustamante Code.

The treaty was not widely accepted. The United States withdrew in the middle of negotiations. Mexico and Colombia did not sign it. Argentina, Uruguay, and Paraguay decided to abide by the rules of the Treaties of Montevideo with regard to private international law. The countries that ratified it did so with large reservations. The treaty is a set of rules that seeks to regulate the legal relations of foreign trade among the countries party to the treaty. The previously-mentioned reservations cover many of the states' discretion on the use of the code in cases that contradicted the countries' domestic legislation and so its actual purposes are distorted.

References

External links
 Text of the Bustamante Code (in Spanish PDF)
 Signatures and ratifications
  Updated signatures, accessions and ratifications list

Conflict of laws
Treaties concluded in 1928
Treaties entered into force in 1928
Organization of American States treaties
Treaties of the First Brazilian Republic
Treaties of Bolivia
Treaties of Chile
Treaties of Costa Rica
Treaties of Cuba
Treaties of the Dominican Republic
Treaties of Ecuador
Treaties of El Salvador
Treaties of Guatemala
Treaties of Haiti
Treaties of Honduras
Treaties of Nicaragua
Treaties of Panama
Treaties of Peru
Treaties of Venezuela
1928 in Cuba